Pouzin may refer to:

 Le Pouzin, a commune in the Ardèche department in France
 Louis Pouzin (born 1931), French computer scientist
 Yvonne Pouzin (1884–1947), French tuberculosis specialist